John Zihun Lee (born March 30, 1968) is an American lawyer serving as a United States circuit judge of the United States Court of Appeals for the Seventh Circuit. He served as a United States district judge of the United States District Court for the Northern District of Illinois from 2012 to 2022.

Biography

Lee was born in Aachen, Germany. He received a Artium Baccalaureus degree from Harvard College in 1989. He received a Juris Doctor from Harvard Law School in 1992.

He first worked as a trial attorney in the United States Department of Justice Environment and Natural Resources Division. He worked as an associate at Mayer Brown, a white shoe Chicago law firm, from 1994 to 1996 and the boutique law firm of Grippo & Elden LLC from 1996 to 1999. He was a partner at Freeborn & Peters LLP in Chicago, where he handled complex federal civil litigation. In the fall of 2000, he was an adjunct professor at The John Marshall Law School teaching a course on antitrust law. In the fall terms of 1990 and 1991, while a teaching fellow at Harvard University, he taught a class on Greek mythology.

Federal judicial service

District court service 
On November 10, 2011, President Barack Obama nominated Lee to be a district judge for the United States District Court for the Northern District of Illinois. He was nominated to the seat vacated by Judge David H. Coar, who assumed senior status on August 12, 2009. Lee received his hearing by the Senate Judiciary Committee on January 26, 2012, and his nomination was reported to the floor on February 16, 2012, by a voice vote, with Senator Mike Lee recording the only no vote. On May 7, 2012, his nomination was confirmed by a voice vote. He received his commission on May 8, 2012. His service as a district judge was terminated on September 12, 2022, when he was elevated to the United States Court of Appeals for the Seventh Circuit.

Notable rulings 
In July 2018, Lee, sitting by designation, wrote for the unanimous panel of the United States Court of Appeals for the Seventh Circuit in Doe No. 55 v. Madison Metropolitan School District when it found that the Madison Metropolitan School District was not liable for child sex abuse of a student by its security guard because the school's principal had not had actual knowledge of the abuse. This decision was affirmed en banc.
On May 3, 2020, Lee ruled that Democratic Illinois Governor J. B. Pritzker's stay-at-home order during the COVID-19 pandemic in Illinois was constitutional, after an Evangelical church sought an injunction against the order in order to continue worship services.

Court of appeals service 

On April 13, 2022, President Joe Biden announced his intent to nominate Lee to serve as a United States circuit judge of the United States Court of Appeals for the Seventh Circuit. On April 25, 2022, his nomination was sent to the Senate. President Biden nominated Lee to the seat to be vacated by Judge Diane Wood, who will assume senior status upon confirmation of a successor. On May 11, 2022, a hearing on his nomination was held before the Senate Judiciary Committee. During his confirmation hearing, Republican senators criticized him over his decision to uphold J. B. Pritzker's stay-at-home order, which limited in-person church services. On June 9, 2022, his nomination was reported out of the committee by a 12–8–2 vote. On September 6, 2022, the United States Senate invoked cloture on his nomination by a 48–42 vote. On September 7, 2022, his nomination was confirmed by a 50–44 vote. He received his judicial commission on September 9, 2022. He is the first Asian American judge to ever serve on the 7th Circuit.

See also
List of Asian American jurists
List of first minority male lawyers and judges in Illinois

References

External links

1968 births
Living people
21st-century American judges
American jurists of Korean descent
Harvard Law School alumni
Illinois lawyers
Judges of the United States Court of Appeals for the Seventh Circuit
Judges of the United States District Court for the Northern District of Illinois
United States court of appeals judges appointed by Joe Biden
United States Department of Justice lawyers
United States district court judges appointed by Barack Obama
Harvard College alumni